Perez Martain Benjamin (October 23, 1791 – August 4, 1850) was a farmer and political figure in Nova Scotia. He represented Horton township in the Nova Scotia House of Assembly from 1836 to 1840 and from 1843 to 1847 as a Reformer.

He was born in Horton, Nova Scotia, the son of Abel Benjamin and Eunice Rand. In 1815, Benjamin married Sarah Stephens. He died in Horton at the age of 58.

References 
 

1791 births
1850 deaths
Nova Scotia pre-Confederation MLAs
People from Kings County, Nova Scotia